Thomas H. Van Lear (April 26, 1869 – March 4, 1931) was an American politician who served as the 28th Mayor of Minneapolis from January 1, 1917 to January 6, 1919. Van Lear was a member of the Socialist Party of America.

Early life
Van Lear was born in Maryland in 1869. As a boy, he worked in the area's coal mines and, at the age of 18, he joined the Knights of Labor. He later served in the United States Army (including a year during the Spanish–American War) before relocating to Minneapolis to work as a machinist. He soon became active with the International Association of Machinists and other trade and union groups in the city.

Career 
Van Lear led two unsuccessful campaigns for the mayoralty before he was elected on November 7, 1916, with over 33,000 votes. Van Lear did not win control of the city council, and Sheriff Otto Langum worked closely with the Minneapolis Citizens' Alliance, an anti-labor coalition of wealthy business magnates. In office, Van Lear welcomed the People's Council of America for Democracy and the Terms of Peace to Minneapolis and refused to approve a law that would effectively ban the Industrial Workers of the World (IWW). The only Socialist mayor in the city's history, Van Lear was defeated for re-election in 1918, amid accusations that he and his supporters secretly desired a German victory in World War I. Van Lear was expelled from the Socialist Party of America in 1918 and later helped to form a local section of the Nonpartisan League that firmly supported the policies of Democratic President Woodrow Wilson.

In 1919, Van Lear worked with Herbert Gaston to found the populist Minnesota Daily Star newspaper. The first issue was printed in August 1920. While the paper had some success as a political tool, it had a difficult time attracting advertisers and went bankrupt in 1924.

Death 
Van Lear died on March 4, 1931. He is interred at Sunset Memorial Park Cemetery in Minneapolis.

See also 
 List of elected socialist mayors in the United States

References

Further reading

 William Millikan,  A Union against Unions: the Minneapolis Citizens Alliance and Its Fight against Organized Labor, 1903-1947. Saint Paul, MN: Minnesota Historical Society Press, 2001.

1869 births
1931 deaths
Mayors of Minneapolis
American socialists
Nonpartisan League politicians
Minnesota socialists
Minnesota Farmer–Laborites
Socialist Party of America politicians from Minnesota